Addison Peale Russell (September 8, 1826 – July 24, 1912) was an American author of the later nineteenth century. He is remembered mainly for his Sub-Coelum — "his best book...a Utopian protest against materialistic socialism."

Russell was born in Ohio; his formal education ended with grammar school. At the age of sixteen he took a job as a printer for a newspaper; by nineteen he had worked his way up to editor and publisher of the Hillsboro, Ohio News. He pursued a journalism career until he switched to politics and public service. He was made clerk of the Ohio Senate in 1850; he later represented Clinton County, Ohio in the Ohio House of Representatives in the 52nd General Assembly (1856–57) as a Republican, and was Ohio Secretary of State (1858–62). He was appointed Financial Agent for Ohio during the American Civil War, stationed in New York City. He retired from public office in 1868 to pursue literature. He wrote seven books:

 Half Tints (1867)
 Library Notes (1875)
 Thomas Corwin (1882)
 Characteristics (1884)
 A Club of One (1887)
 In a Club Corner (1890)
 ''Sub-Coelum (1893).

Apart from his biographical survey of Thomas Corwin, an Ohio governor, Russell's books generally fall into the category of belles-lettres.

References

Bibliography

External links
 
 

Writers from Ohio
American essayists
1826 births
1912 deaths
People from Wilmington, Ohio
Secretaries of State of Ohio
Republican Party members of the Ohio House of Representatives
19th-century American politicians